The Southern Collegiate Athletic Conference men's basketball tournament is the annual conference basketball championship tournament for the NCAA Division III Southern Collegiate Athletic Conference. The current iteration of the tournament has been held annually since 2003; a prior incarnation was played between 1963 and 1973. The current version is a single-elimination tournament and seeding is based on regular season records.

The winner, declared conference champion, receives the SCAC's automatic bid to the NCAA Men's Division III Basketball Championship.

Results

Tournament (1963–1971)

Round-robin (1972–1973)

Tournament (2003–present)

Championship records

Austin (TX) has not yet qualified for the SCAC tournament finals
Rose–Hulman, Birmingham–Southern, Hendrix, and Johnson & Wales–Denver never qualified for the finals while members of SCAC
 Schools highlighted in pink are former members of the Southern Collegiate Athletic Conference

References

NCAA Division III men's basketball conference tournaments
Southern Collegiate Athletic Conference basketball
Recurring sporting events established in 1994